In Mandaeism, the bshuma is a religious formula that is often written at the beginnings of chapters in Mandaean texts and prayers. The Islamic equivalent is the basmala.

The full form of the bshuma is "In the name of Hayyi Rabbi",.

Related formulas
At the ends of Mandaean prayers and texts, the following formulas are often recited to conclude the prayer or text.

"And Hayyi is victorious"
"And praise be to Hayyi"

See also
Basmala
Berakhah
Brakha

References

Mandaean prayer
Religious formulas
Mandaic words and phrases